The Embassy of Georgia in Washington, D.C. is the diplomatic mission of the Republic of Georgia to the United States. It is located at 1824 R Street, Northwest, Washington, D.C. The Embassy was founded in 1993 after the establishment of diplomatic relations between Georgia and the United States. 

The current Ambassador of Georgia to the United States is David Bakradze, appointed in November 2016.

The Embassy serves as a Consulate of Georgia in Washington, D.C. and serves the citizens of Georgia residing in the following US States: District of Columbia, Virginia, Maryland, North Carolina, South Carolina, Georgia and Florida. 

Georgia has consulates-general located in New York City and in San Francisco.

Bilateral Relations

Since 1993, Georgia and United States have been engaged in diplomatic relations encompassing multiple sectors.
In 2009, Georgia and United States advanced bilateral relations to a new level by signing a  Strategic Partnership Agreement which deepens cooperation between the two states in multiple fields.  The first meeting of the Strategic Partnership Commission, held on June 22, 2009, launched four bilateral working groups on priority areas identified in the Charter: democracy, defense and security, economic, trade and energy issues, and people-to-people and cultural exchanges.
Senior-level Georgian and American policy-makers lead yearly meetings of each working group to review commitments, update activities, and establish future objectives. Annual plenary sessions of the commission are co-chaired by Prime-Minister of Georgia and the United States Secretary of State.

List of Ambassadors of Georgia to the United States
David Bakradze 2016-Present 
 Archil Gegeshidze 2013–2016
 Temur Yakobashvili 2010–2013
 Batu Kutelia 2009–2010
 Vasil Sikharulidze 2007–2009
 Levan Mikeladze 2003–2007
 Tedo Japaridze 1994–2003
   Petre Chkheidze 1993-1994

See also
 Georgia–United States relations
List of ambassadors of Georgia (country) to the United States

References

External links

Official website

Georgia
Washington, D.C.
Georgia (country)–United States relations
Georgia